Louis Cohen (Born Louis Kushner alias “Louis Kerzner” January 1, 1904 – January 28, 1939) was a New York mobster who murdered labor racketeer "Kid Dropper" Nathan Kaplan and was an associate of labor racketeer Louis "Lepke" Buchalter. He was killed along with Isadore Friedman, another Buchalter associate, who was believed to be an informant. It is not known whether Cohen was murdered for being a potential informant or whether he was accidentally killed during the shooting that was supposed to target Friedman.

Biography
Born Louis Kushner aka Kerzner, Cohen was a minor criminal in the employ of racketeer Jacob "Little Augie" Orgen when he was hired by lieutenants Louis Buchalter, Jacob "Gurrah" Shapiro and Jack "Legs" Diamond to murder rival mobster Nathan Kaplan. He later killed him while under police escort outside the Essex Market Court House in lower Manhattan on August 28, 1923. Immediately arrested by police, he was subsequently convicted of Dropper's murder and sentenced to 20 years to life imprisonment at Sing Sing Prison. Released on parole in 1937, he was gunned down on January 28, 1939.

Footnotes

References
Asbury, Herbert. The Gangs of New York. New York: Alfred A. Knopf, 1928. 
Sifakis, Carl. The Mafia Encyclopedia. New York: Da Capo Press, 2005.

Further reading
Chiocca, Olindo Romeo. Mobsters and Thugs: Quotes from the Underworld. Toronto: Guernica Editions, 2000.

External links

1904 births
1939 deaths
1939 murders in the United States
20th-century American criminals
People murdered by Murder, Inc.
Murdered Jewish American gangsters
Male murder victims
Deaths by firearm in Manhattan
People murdered in New York City
Burials at Mount Hebron Cemetery (New York City)
20th-century American Jews